Mary Makes It Easy is a Canadian television cooking show hosted by Mary Berg, which premiered on CTV Life Channel in 2021. The show, which is shot in Berg's real home kitchen, is designed around simple, easy-to-make recipes for people who struggle with their cooking skills.

Episodes also air on CTV and CTV Two after premiering on CTV Life. In February 2022, Mary Makes It Easy premiered on Food Network in the United States.

The series won two Canadian Screen Awards at the 10th Canadian Screen Awards in 2022, for Best Lifestyle Program and Best Host in a Lifestyle Program (Berg).

References

2021 Canadian television series debuts
2020s Canadian cooking television series
CTV Life Channel original programming